Nordson Corporation is an American multinational corporation that designs and manufactures dispensing equipment for consumer and industrial adhesives, sealants and coatings. The company also manufactures equipment used in the testing and inspection of electronic components, technology-based systems 
for curing and surface treatment processes as well as medical devices and component technologies. The company is headquartered in Westlake, Ohio, and has direct operations and sales-support offices in approximately 30 countries.

Nordson Corporation has eight divisions:

 Nordson Electronic Solutions
 Nordson Test & Inspection
 Nordson Efd
 Nordson Medical
 Nordson Measurement & Control
 Nordson Polymer Processing Systems
 Nordson Adhesive Dispensing Systems
 Nordson Industrial Coating Systems

Acquisitions 
In November 2022, it was announced Nordson Corporation had completed the acquisition of the Minneapolis, Minnesota-headquartered developer and manufacturer of high-precision 3D optical sensing technology solutions, CyberOptics Corporation.

Awards

IndustryWeek
In 2008, Nordson's assembly facility in Swainsboro, Georgia (with a staff of 67 employees) was the subject of a "Best Plants" profile by IndustryWeek magazine.

SMT Magazine
Nordson EFD won the 2010 SMT Vision Award for its UltimusTM V High-precision Dispenser.

Intel
Nordson ASYMTEK received an Intel Corporation’s Preferred Quality Supplier (PQS) award in 2009.

NEO
In 2012, it received a Northeast Ohio Success Award from Inside Business magazine.

References

External links 
 

Companies listed on the Nasdaq
Manufacturing companies based in Ohio
Cuyahoga County, Ohio
American companies established in 1954
Manufacturing companies established in 1954
1954 establishments in Ohio
Industrial machine manufacturers